The University of Cape Town (UCT) is a public research university located in Cape Town, South Africa.

It may also refer to:

Chemistry
Upper consolute temperature, the critical temperature above which the components of a mixture are miscible in all proportions

Places
Temuco Catholic University
Ukhta Airport
University of Chemistry and Technology, Prague

Other uses
Upper Confidence Tree (upper confidence bounds applied to trees), a Monte Carlo tree search algorithm
Unconditional cash transfer
Coordinated Universal Time (UTC, of which UCT is a deprecated alias)